The Bahamas competed at the 1960 Summer Olympics in Rome, Italy.

Athletics

Men
Track & road events

Sailing

Open

See also
Bahamas at the 1959 Pan American Games

References
Official Olympic Reports
sports-reference

Nations at the 1960 Summer Olympics
1960
Olympics